Stanhopea florida is a species of orchid occurring from Ecuador to Peru.

References

External links 

florida
Orchids of Ecuador
Orchids of Peru